Acanthodactylus tilburyi, known commonly as Tilbury's fringe-fingered lizard, Tilbury's fringe-toed lizard, and Tilbury's spiny-footed lizard, is a species of lizard in the family Lacertidae. The species is endemic to the Middle East.

Etymology
The specific name, tilburyi, is in honor of South African herpetologist Colin R. Tilbury.

Geographic range
A. tilburyi is found in Jordan and Saudi Arabia.

Habitat
The preferred habitat of A. tilburyi is desert.

Reproduction
A. tilburyi is oviparous.

References

Further reading
Arnold EN (1986). "A New Spiny-Footed Lizard (Acanthodactylus: Lacertidae) from Saudi Arabia". Fauna of Saudi Arabia 8: 378–384. (Acanthodactylus tilburyi, new species). (in English, with an abstract in Arabic).
Disi, Ahmad M.; Modrý, David; Nečas, Petr; Rifai, Lina (2001). Amphibians and Reptiles of the Hashemite Kingdom of Jordan. Frankfurt am Main, Germany: Chimaira. 408 pp. .
Leviton, Alan E.; Anderson, Steven C.; Adler, Kraig; Minton, Sherman A. (1992). Handbook to Middle East Amphibians and Reptiles. (Contributions to Herpetology No. 8). Oxford, Ohio: Society for the Study of Amphibians and Reptiles (SSAR). 252 pp. .
Sindaco, Roberto; Jeremčenko, Valery K. (2008). The Reptiles of the Western Palearctic: 1. Annotated Checklist and Distributional Atlas of the Turtles, Crocodiles, Amphisbaenians and Lizards of Europe, North Africa, Middle East and Central Asia. (Monographs of the Societas Herpetologica Italica). Latina, Italy: Edizioni Belvedere. 580 pp. .

Acanthodactylus
Lizards of Asia
Reptiles of the Arabian Peninsula
Reptiles of Jordan
Reptiles described in 1986
Taxa named by Edwin Nicholas Arnold